W.A.K.O. World Championships 2005 may refer to:

 W.A.K.O. World Championships 2005 (Agadir)
 W.A.K.O. World Championships 2005 (Szeged)